Kottapeta Rowdy is a 1980 Indian Telugu-language action drama film, produced by Suryanarayana, Satyanarayana under Satya Chitra banner and directed by P. Sambasiva Rao. It stars Krishna, Jaya Prada in lead roles while Chiranjeevi in special appearance and music composed by K. V. Mahadevan.

Cast 
Krishna as Krishna
Jaya Prada as Radha 
Chiranjeevi as Prasanna Kumar
Nutan Prasad as Kailasam
Mohan Babu as Vaikuntham
Rallapalli
P. L. Narayana
Kaikala Satyanarayana as Punyakoti
Pandari Bai as Krishna's mother
Sarathi
C.H. Narayana Rao as Prasanna Kumar's father
Jyothi Lakshmi as Ranjani
Chalapathi Rao
Lakshmikanth

References

External links

1980 films
Films scored by K. V. Mahadevan
1980s Telugu-language films